Nathaniel Edward Yorke-Davies (1841–1914) was a British surgeon and consulting physician in dietetics only. His most famous patient was William Howard Taft.

Early life and education
Yorke-Davies, whose father was headmaster at Llanrwst Grammar School, was educated at Cheltenham College and other schools before entering St Bartholomew's Hospital. He qualified L.S.A. in 1865, L.M. Dub. in 1865, M.R.C.S. Eng. in 1866, and L.R.C.P Lond. in 1871.

Career 
After a brief period of service in the Egyptian navy, he became a specialist in dietetics; he gained an international reputation in that speciality as an author of several books and numerous articles in medical and popular journals.

His 1889 book Foods for the Fat: A Treatise on Corpulency urged overweight people to a consult a physician, who would provide psychological support and an individualised plan for diet and exercise. His book criticised Banting's dietary plan for its extreme severity and Ebstein's dietary plan for recommending too much fat. The book remained popular for many years; the 17th edition appeared in 1906 and sold 35,000 copies.

Gluten and bran baked goods made using Dr. Yorke-Davies's recipes were sold for the treatment of obesity and diabetes.

Upon his death he was survived by his widow, two sons, and a daughter.

Selected publications

References

External links

British nutritionists
Dietitians
1841 births
1914 deaths
Diet food advocates
People educated at Cheltenham College
19th-century British non-fiction writers
20th-century British non-fiction writers
19th-century British medical doctors
20th-century British medical doctors